Sandhya Bauri (born 2 September 1951) is a political and social worker and a Member of Parliament elected from the Vishnupur constituency in the Indian  state of West Bengal being a Communist Party of India (Marxist) candidate.

Early life
Sandhya was born on 2 September 1951 in Khatra, district Bankura (West Bengal). She married Shri Nimai Charan Bauri on 28 February 1972. She has four daughters. One of her daughters, Susmita Bauri was also a Member of Parliament.

Education & career
Sandhya is an undergraduate and studied at Bankura Christian College, Bankura (West Bengal).

She was first elected to the 11th Lok Sabha in 1996. From 1996 to 1997, she served as
 Member, Committee on Food, Civil Supplies and Public Distribution
 Member, Committee on the Empowerment of Women
 Member, Consultative Committee, Ministry of Welfare

She was elected to the 13th Lok Sabha for a 3rd term in 1999. During 1999–2004, she served as
 Member, Committee on Labour and Welfare
 Member, Consultative Committee, Ministry of Textiles

Special interests & social activities
She has worked for women and child development, upliftment of the downtrodden and the weaker sections. She has also organized and staged dramas for children. 
She enjoys reading, writing and playing games during her leisure time. She also plays indoor games like carom and table tennis.

References

Women in West Bengal politics
Communist Party of India (Marxist) politicians from West Bengal
India MPs 1999–2004
India MPs 1996–1997
People from Bankura district
1951 births
Living people
Articles created or expanded during Women's History Month (India) - 2014
20th-century Indian women politicians
20th-century Indian politicians
21st-century Indian women politicians
21st-century Indian politicians
India MPs 1998–1999